Newness Ends is the debut album by The New Year, released on February 20, 2001, through Touch & Go Records. The New Year is led by former Bedhead co-founders Matt and Bubba Kadane. The album received very positive reviews and has been compared to their work in Bedhead.

Track listing

Personnel
Matt Kadane - vocals, guitar, production
Bubba Kadane - guitar, production, vocals ("Simple Life")
Mike Donofio - bass
Chris Brokaw - drums
Steve Albini - recording engineer
John Golden - mastering

References

External links
The New Year official website

2001 albums
The New Year albums
Touch and Go Records albums